Yasny (masculine), Yasnaya (feminine), or Yasnoye (neuter) is the name of several inhabited localities in Russia.

Urban localities
Yasny, Orenburg Oblast, a town in Orenburg Oblast

Rural localities
Yasny, Amur Oblast, a settlement in Oktyabrsky Rural Settlement of Zeysky District of Amur Oblast
Yasny, Arkhangelsk Oblast, a settlement in Shilegsky Selsoviet of Pinezhsky District of Arkhangelsk Oblast
Yasny, Republic of Bashkortostan, a village in Dmitriyevsky Selsoviet of Ufimsky District of the Republic of Bashkortostan
Yasny, Kursk Oblast, a khutor in Belyayevsky Selsoviet of Konyshyovsky District of Kursk Oblast
Yasny, Mari El Republic, a settlement in Solnechny Rural Okrug of Sovetsky District of the Mari El Republic
Yasny, Bagayevsky District, Rostov Oblast, a settlement in Manychskoye Rural Settlement of Bagayevsky District of Rostov Oblast
Yasny, Krasnosulinsky District, Rostov Oblast, a khutor in Kovalevskoye Rural Settlement of Krasnosulinsky District of Rostov Oblast
Yasny, Shpakovsky District, Stavropol Krai, a settlement in Tsimlyansky Selsoviet of Shpakovsky District of Stavropol Krai
Yasny, Turkmensky District, Stavropol Krai, a settlement in Novokucherlinsky Selsoviet of Turkmensky District of Stavropol Krai
Yasny, Tula Oblast, a settlement in Bolshe-Ozersky Rural Okrug of Plavsky District of Tula Oblast
Yasnoye, Kaliningrad Oblast, a settlement in Yasnovsky Rural Okrug of Slavsky District of Kaliningrad Oblast
Yasnoye, Nizhny Novgorod Oblast, a selo in Sechenovsky Selsoviet of Sechenovsky District of Nizhny Novgorod Oblast
Yasnoye, Artyom, Primorsky Krai, a selo under the administrative jurisdiction of Artyom City Under Krai Jurisdiction in Primorsky Krai
Yasnoye, Chuguyevsky District, Primorsky Krai, a selo in Chuguyevsky District, Primorsky Krai
Yasnoye, Sakhalin Oblast, a selo in Tymovsky District of Sakhalin Oblast
Yasnoye, Vologda Oblast, a settlement in Dubrovsky Selsoviet of Babayevsky District of Vologda Oblast
Yasnaya, Kurgan Oblast, a village in Pritobolny Selsoviet of Pritobolny District of Kurgan Oblast
Yasnaya, Zabaykalsky Krai, a settlement at the station in Olovyanninsky District of Zabaykalsky Krai

See also
Yasnensky (disambiguation)